Burkinshaw may refer to:

List of persons with the surname

Donaldson & Burkinshaw - a law partnership in Singapore
George Burkinshaw (1922–1982), English footballer
Jack Burkinshaw (1890–1947), English footballer
Keith Burkinshaw (born 1935), English footballer
Laurie Burkinshaw (1893–1969), English footballer
Ralph Burkinshaw (1898–1951), English footballer
Ross Burkinshaw (born 1986), English boxer

References

Surnames
Patronymic surnames
Surnames of British Isles origin
Surnames of English origin
English-language surnames